Sung Kook Hwang (Korean: 황성국), also known as Bill Hwang, is a Korean-born American investor and trader. In April 2021, The Wall Street Journal reported that Hwang lost US$20billion over 10 days in late March, imposing large losses on his bankers Nomura and Credit Suisse. On April 27, 2022, he was indicted on federal charges of fraud and racketeering.

Early life 
Hwang was born in South Korea in 1964.

Hwang earned an economics degree from UCLA, and an MBA from the Tepper School of Business at Carnegie Mellon University.

Career 
Hwang began his career at Hyundai Securities in New York, then worked at the now defunct Peregrine Investments Holdings, where he met billionaire hedge fund manager Julian Robertson, who was a client, and went to work for Robertson's Tiger Management. Robertson closed the fund in 2000 but, during his time as its owner, he'd provided some of whom he considered to be his most promising employees, known as the "Tiger Cubs", with funding to start their own hedge funds. Robertson gave Hwang a starting capital of about $25 million to launch his own Tiger Asia Management fund, which grew to over $5 billion at its peak, before suffering "heavy losses" during the 2007-09 Great Recession.

Insider trading
In 2012, Tiger Asia Management and Hwang admitted to illegally using inside information to trade Chinese banks' stocks, and agreed to criminal and civil settlements totaling more than US$60 million. Tiger Asia Management, Hwang, Tiger Asia Partnersm and former head trader Raymond Park also paid US$44 million in penalties to the Securities and Exchange Commission.

In 2014, Hwang was banned from trading in Hong Kong for a period of four years.

Archegos Capital
In 2012, Hwang closed Tiger Asia Management, and opened a "family office," which is more lightly regulated than was a hedge fund, named Archegos Capital Management, which managed US$10 billion of funds.

In March 2021, losses at Archegos triggered the default and liquidation of positions approaching $30 billion in value, leading to "substantial" losses for Nomura,Credit Suisse, Goldman Sachs, and Morgan Stanley. The firm had held large positions in ViacomCBS, Baidu, Vipshop, Farfetch, and others. Before the Archego collapse, Hwang was believed to be worth $10–15 billion, with his investments leveraged at 5:1.

In November 2021, Credit Suisse, having taken a hit of $5.5 billion from the Archegos losses, shut down its prime brokerage business. Texas Capital Bancshares Inc, in which Archegos held a 20% share, plunged after Archegos' collapse.

Indictment
On April 27, 2022, Hwang and his former top lieutenant, Patrick Halligan, were arrested and charged with racketeering, conspiracy, securities fraud, and wire fraud as part of a scheme to harm investors. In a 59-page indictment, Manhattan federal prosecutors alleged that Hwang and Halligan schemed to manipulate stock prices. Lawyers for Hwang and Halligan stated that they were innocent of the charges in the indictment. Hwang was released on a $100 million bond, which was secured by two properties and $5 million in cash. Halligan was released on a $1 million bond.

On September 8, 2022, District Judge Alvin Hellerstein set October 2023 as the month when the trial of Hwang and Halligan, both of whom have pleaded not guilty, will begin. Former Archegos head trader William Tomita and ex-Chief Risk Officer Scott Becker have both pleaded guilty and agreed to testify against Hwang and Halligan.

Personal life 
Hwang is a Christian and his father was a pastor. Hwang and his wife reside in Tenafly, New Jersey and they have a daughter, Joanne, who's attended Fordham University in New York City.

Charitable work
Hwang has co-founded the Grace and Mercy Foundation, a charitable organization, which, by 2018, had reportedly "more than US$500 million in assets."

See also 
 Koreans in New York City

References 

Tiger Management
Living people
American hedge fund managers
American stock traders
Philanthropists from New Jersey
University of California, Los Angeles alumni
Tepper School of Business alumni
American people of Korean descent
Christians from New Jersey
People from Tenafly, New Jersey
People charged with racketeering
People charged with wire fraud
1964 births